Tyapino is a rural locality (a village) in Yurochenskoye Rural Settlement, Sheksninsky District, Vologda Oblast, Russia. The population was 53 as of 2002.

Geography 
Tyapino is located 32 km south of Sheksna (the district's administrative centre) by road. Yurochkino is the nearest rural locality.

References 

Rural localities in Sheksninsky District